Alice Ernestine Prin (2 October 1901 – 29 April 1953), nicknamed the Queen of Montparnasse and often known as Kiki de Montparnasse, was a French model, chanteuse, actress, memoirist and painter during the Jazz Age. She flourished in, and helped define, the liberated culture of Paris in the so-called Années folles ("crazy years" in French). She became one of the most famous models of the 20th century and in the history of avant-garde art.

Early life 
Born as an illegitimate child in Châtillon-sur-Seine, Côte d'Or, Alice Prin had "a wretched childhood that could only lead to laughter or despair". She was raised in abject poverty by her grandmother. At age twelve, she was sent by train to live with her mother, a linotypist, in Paris in order to help earn an income for her family. Harsh, degrading jobs followed, and she worked in printing shops, shoe factories and bakeries. During this time, she began her lifelong joy of decorating herself. She "would crumble a petal from her mother's fake geraniums to give color to her cheeks and was fired from a nasty job at a bakery because she darkened her eyebrows with burnt matchsticks".

By the age of fourteen, Prin's "large and splendid body" had garnered the artistic and sexual attention of various Parisian denizens, and she began surreptitiously posing nude for sculptors. "It bothered me a little to take off my clothes," Prin wrote her in her memoirs, but "it was the custom". Her decision to become a nude model created discord with her mother. One day, her mother unexpectedly intruded into an artist's studio in a rage, denounced Prin as a shameless prostitute, and disowned her forever.

Now without money or a roof over her head, the teenage Kiki determined to make her living exclusively by posing for artists. As a beautiful dark-haired French girl, she soon found herself in popular demand. At the time, she had scant pubic hair and, when posing, she occasionally would draw on fake hair with a piece of charcoal.

Modeling career 
Adopting a single name, "Kiki", Prin became a fixture of the Montparnasse social scene and a popular model, posing for dozens of artists, including Sanyu, Chaïm Soutine, Julien Mandel, Tsuguharu Foujita, Constant Detré, Francis Picabia, Jean Cocteau, Arno Breker, Alexander Calder, Per Krohg, Hermine David, Pablo Gargallo and Tono Salazar. Moïse Kisling painted a portrait of Kiki titled Nu assis, one of his best known. In his 1976 book Memoirs of Montparnasse, Canadian poet John Glassco recalled that: 

In Autumn 1921, Prin met the American visual artist Man Ray, and the two soon entered into a stormy eight-year relationship. She lived with Man Ray in his studio on rue Campagne-Première until 1929 during which time he made hundreds of portraits of her. She became his muse at the time and the subject of some of his best-known images, including the surrealist image Le Violon d'Ingres (Ingres' Violin) and Noire et blanche (Black and White). She also appeared in nine short and frequently experimental films, including Fernand Léger's 1923 Dadaist work Ballet mécanique without any credit.

By 1929, Prin had reached the zenith of her fame. A symbol of bohemian and creative Paris and of the possibility of being a woman and finding an artistic place, she was elected the Queen of Montparnasse at the age of twenty-eight. Despite her local fame, she continued to live a hand-to-mouth existence. Even during difficult times, she maintained her positive attitude, saying "all I need is an onion, a bit of bread, and a bottle of red [wine]; and I will always find somebody to offer me that."

Artwork and autobiography 

A painter in her own right, Prin had a sold-out exhibition of her paintings in 1927 at the Galerie au Sacre du Printemps in Paris. Signing her work with her chosen single name, Kiki, her drawings and paintings comprise portraits, self-portraits, social activities, fanciful animals and dreamy landscapes composed in a light, slightly uneven, expressionist style that is a reflection of her carefree manner and boundless optimism.

In 1929, she published an autobiography titled Kiki's Memoirs, with Ernest Hemingway and Tsuguharu Foujita providing introductions. In 1930, the book was translated by Samuel Putnam and published in Manhattan by Black Manikin Press, but it was immediately banned by the United States government. A copy of the first US edition was held in the section for banned books in the New York Public Library through the 1970s. However, the book had been reprinted under the title The Education of a Young Model throughout the 1950s and 1960s (e.g., a 1954 edition by Bridgehead has the Hemingway Introduction and photos and illustrations by Mahlon Blaine).

These editions were mainly put out by unscrupulous publisher Samuel Roth. Taking advantage that banned books did not receive copyright protection in the U.S., Roth put out a series of supposedly copyrighted editions (which were never registered with the Library of Congress) which altered the text and added illustrations—line drawings and photographs—which were not by Prin. After 1955, Roth appended an extra ten chapters falsely credited to Prin 23 years after the original book, including an invented visit to New York where she met with Roth himself. None of this was true. The original autobiography finally saw a new translation and publication in 1996.

For a few years during the 1930s, Prin owned the Montparnasse cabaret L'Oasis, which was later renamed Chez Kiki. Her music hall performances in black hose and garters included crowd-pleasing risqué songs, which were uninhibited, yet inoffensive. She later departed Paris to avoid the occupying German army during World War II, which entered the city in June 1940. She did not return to live in the city immediately after the war.

Death and legacy 
Prin died at the age of fifty-one on 29 April 1953 after collapsing outside her flat in Montparnasse, apparently of complications of alcoholism or drug dependence. A large crowd of artists and admirers attended her Paris funeral and followed the procession to her interment in the Cimetière parisien de Thiais. Her tomb identifies her as: "Kiki, 1901–1953, singer, actress, painter, Queen of Montparnasse".

In the wake of her death, Life magazine featured a three-page obituary of Prin in its 29 June 1953 edition, concluding with a memory from one of her friends who said: "We laughed, my God how we laughed." Tsuguharu Foujita remarked that, with Kiki's death, the glorious days of Montparnasse were buried forever.

Long after her death, Prin remains the embodiment of the outspokenness, audacity and creativity that marked the interwar period of life in Montparnasse. She represents a strong artistic force in her own right as a woman. In 1989, biographers Billy Klüver and Julie Martin called her "one of the century's first truly independent women". In her honor, a daylily has been named Kiki de Montparnasse.

On May 14, 2022, Le Violon d'Ingres, which depicts Prin's back overlaid with a violin's f-holes, sold for $12.4 million, setting a record as the most expensive photograph ever sold at auction.

Gallery

Filmography 
 1923: L'Inhumaine by Marcel L'Herbier
 1923: Le Retour à la Raison by Man Ray, short film
 1923: Ballet Mécanique by Fernand Léger, short film
 1923: Entr'acte by René Clair, short film
 1923: La Galerie des monstres by Jaque Catelain
 1926: Emak-Bakia by Man Ray, short film
 1928: L'Étoile de mer by Man Ray
 1928: Paris express or Souvenirs de Paris by Pierre Prévert and Marcel Duhamel, short film
 1930: Le Capitaine jaune by Anders Wilhelm Sandberg
 1933: Cette vieille canaille by Anatole Litvak

Kiki's Memoirs 
 
 
 
 Kiki's Memoirs (1996) translation by Samuel Putnam (original ed. published by J. Corti, Paris) 
 Souvenirs, introduction by Ernest Hemingway and Tsuguharu Foujita, forward and notes by Billy Klüver and Julie Martin, translation by Dominique Lablanche, Hazan, 1999.
 Souvenirs retrouvés, preface by Serge Plantureux, José Corti, 2005.
 Kiki's Memoirs (2009) [Recuerdos recobrados] translation by José Pazó Espinosa (in Spanish – published by Nocturna)
 Kiki Souvenirs, 1929 (2005) translation by N. Semoniff (in Russian – published by Salamandra P.V.V., 2011)
 Kiki's Memoirs, 1930 (2006) translation by N. Semoniff (in Russian – published by Salamandra P.V.V., 2011)

References

Citations

Works cited

Further reading

External links 
 
 
 

1901 births
1953 deaths
People from Châtillon-sur-Seine
French artists' models
French women painters
Modern painters
Muses
Nightclub performers
Burials at Montparnasse Cemetery
20th-century French women singers
20th-century French women artists